Toos & Henk is a cartoon created by Dutch cartoonist Paul Kusters.

The cartoons consist of a single picture and are each independent. The two main characters with the names Toos and Henk form a couple that can be described as more or less average for Dutch society.

Toos & Henk is a daily cartoon series based on current events that can be followed in the newspapers Dagblad de Limburger, Limburgs Dagblad, Brabants Dagblad, De Gooi- en Eemlander, Provinciale Zeeuwse Courant, De Gelderlander, De Twentsche Courant Tubantia, Dagblad van het Noorden, Noordhollands Dagblad, Haarlems Dagblad, Leidsch Dagblad, BN/De Stem, De Stentor and HDC.
 
Since 16 February 2015, the cartoon was also shown on television in RTL Late Night.

References

Dutch comic strips
Dutch comics characters
Gag cartoon comics
Male characters in comics
Comic strip duos
Fictional Dutch people
Humor comics
Comics set in the Netherlands
1999 comics debuts